This is a list of recurring characters in the Pokémon video game series. Characters may appear in multiple continuities within the Pokémon franchise, such as the various animated adaptations, films, manga, or books. In these spin-offs of the video games, the characters may take on the same basic role (such as with Professor Oak and Giovanni in the long-running Pokémon TV-series) and sometimes in very different roles (such as with Misty and Brock).

Each main-series Pokémon game features a player character protagonist or set of protagonists, one or more rival characters, a hometown "Pokémon professor" who introduces the mechanics of the game, and a large selection of fellow Pokémon trainers, "Gym leaders," and villainous teams to battle against.

Kanto
Characters that were introduced in the video games Pokémon Red, Green, Blue (1996), Yellow (1998), FireRed, LeafGreen (2004), Let's Go, Pikachu!, or Let's Go, Eevee! (2018). These video games are all set in the fictional Kanto region. Many of these characters recur throughout the Pokémon franchise.

Protagonists
 is the only protagonist of Pokémon Red, Green, Blue and Yellow and the male protagonist of Pokémon FireRed and LeafGreen. Red later appears in Pokémon Gold, Silver, and Crystal as a secret boss fight on Mt. Silver, and makes further reappearances in Pokémon Black 2 and White 2, Pokémon Sun and Moon, and Pokémon Ultra Sun and Ultra Moon, as well as in Pokémon HeartGold and SoulSilver, reprising his role from the originals. In Pokémon Adventures, he is the champion of Kanto.

 is the female protagonist of Pokémon FireRed and LeafGreen.

Rivals
 is the rival character of Pokémon Red, Green, Blue, Yellow, FireRed, and LeafGreen. He is pushy and competitive, but is generally a good Pokémon Trainer. He is the grandson of Professor Oak and the player's childhood friend. After that he became the Champion of the Kanto region, waiting for the player to challenge him. Blue is the basis for Gary Oak in the anime. IGN listed Blue as the 98th best villain in video games, though they stressed that it was difficult to view him as a villain. Three years later in Pokémon Gold, Silver and Crystal and their remakes, Pokémon HeartGold and SoulSilver, he becomes a Gym Leader for Viridian City. He acts as Kanto's Champion in Pokémon Black 2 and White 2's Pokémon World Tournament, and alongside Red in Pokémon Sun and Moon and their Ultra versions.

 is the rival character of Pokémon: Let's Go, Pikachu! and Let's Go, Eevee!. He is considered far too nice by many. He eventually becomes Champion of Kanto, and acts in a similar vein to Blue.

Professor Oak
Professor Samuel Oak is a Pokémon researcher and the grandfather of Blue in Pokémon Red, Blue, Green, Yellow, FireRed, LeafGreen, Let's Go, Pikachu!. and Let's Go, Eevee!. He is often considered the leading Pokémon expert, often giving lectures to Pokémon academies and hosting a radio show in Goldenrod City and specializes in Pokémon behavioral science. Alongside his research, he is also authorized by the Pokémon League to give new Pokémon trainers one of the three Kanto starter Pokémon: Bulbasaur, Squirtle or Charmander. In the anime, he gives Ash Ketchum his Pikachu after Ash arrives too late to receive one of the usual three starter Pokémon. In Pokémon Yellow, he gives Red a Pikachu after Blue took an Eevee. A younger version of the character has a major supporting role in the movie Pokémon 4Ever.

Gym leaders and Elite Four
Each main-series Pokémon game includes a group of eight "Gym leaders", who award the player character a badge upon defeat. Each Gym leader possesses a team of several Pokémon of similar type or theming, such as electricity-themed Gym or a greenhouse-themed Gym. Particularly notable Gym leaders of the Kanto-based games include:
 Brock: Gym Leader of Pewter City and an expert on Rock-type Pokémon. In the Pokémon anime, he joins protagonist Ash on his adventure, leaving his post to his father, Flint. However, in Pokémon Chronicles, he returns to find his mother leading the gym, using Water-type Pokémon.
 Misty: Gym Leader of Cerulean City and an expert in Water-type Pokémon. In the anime, she leaves this post for a time to join protagonist Ash on his adventure. In Pokémon Chronicles, Misty returns to take over as the Gym Leader from her sisters and becomes one of the main characters, often co-starring with Tracey Sketchit, Casey or one of her sisters: Daisy, Lily and Violet.

In addition to Brock and Misty, the remaining gym leaders include Lt. Surge, Erika, Sabrina, Koga, Blaine, and Giovanni.

Each main-series Pokémon game also includes a group of elite-level trainers at the end of the game, which is called the Elite Four in Kanto. This team includes the Ice-themed Lorelei, Fighting-themed Bruno, Ghost-themed Agatha, and Dragon-themed Lance.

Team Rocket
Giovanni is the leader of the villainous Team Rocket. He runs the ground-type Gym in Pokémon Red, Blue, Green, Yellow and their remakes, Pokémon FireRed and LeafGreen. He later disappears and is not seen again, though Team Rocket attempts to locate him in Pokémon Gold, Silver and Crystal and their remakes, Pokémon HeartGold and SoulSilver, the latter of which he appears via a downloadable event. He also appears as the final boss of Pokémon Ultra Sun and Ultra Moon in the postgame story event. Giovanni is a recurring character in the Pokémon anime series as well.

Jessie and James are a pair of Team Rocket grunts who originate from the Pokémon anime series. The appear as mini-bosses in Yellow, Let's Go, Pikachu! and Let's Go, Eevee!. The duo's name is a reference to Jesse James, an outlaw. Their Japanese names are references to two famed swordsmen in Japanese history, Sasaki Kojirō and Miyamoto Musashi, who famously fought each other on the Island of Ganryū in 1612, resulting in Musashi's victory and Kojirō's death.

Bill
Bill is the inventor of the PC system used to digitally store Pokémon creatures. In the games, he manages to briefly turn himself into a human-Pokémon hybrid by accident. In the anime, Bill was presented with green hair, but all other reincarnations of him included brown hair. He is loosely based on Bill Gates, founder of Microsoft.

Johto
Characters that were introduced in the video games Pokémon Gold, Silver (1999), Crystal (2000), HeartGold, or SoulSilver (2009). These video games are all primarily set in the fictional Johto region.

Protagonists
 is the protagonist of Pokémon Gold and Silver, and the male protagonist of Pokémon Crystal, HeartGold, and SoulSilver.

 is the female protagonist of Pokémon Crystal.  is the female protagonist of Pokémon HeartGold and SoulSilver.

Silver
 is the rival of Pokémon Gold, Silver, Crystal and HeartGold and SoulSilver. This character steals his first Pokémon from Professor Elm and tends to see Pokémon as tools, to use and discard. Unlike the first rival, his view on Pokémon makes him a mediocre trainer, though the sage in the Sprout Tower recognizes that he is talented and has great potential, as does Lance, the Johto Champion. He eventually realizes his wrongdoings and changes his ways by treating his Pokémon and even the player with respect. This comes to a head in Pokémon Masters EX, in which he is identified by Ho-Oh as being pure of heart and becomes his Pokémon. He is finally revealed to be the son of Team Rocket Boss Giovanni.

Professor Elm
Professor Elm is an absent-minded Pokémon researcher and former student of Professor Oak. In Pokémon Gold, Silver, and Crystal, he is authorized by the Pokémon League to give new Pokémon trainers one of the three Johto starter Pokémon: Chikorita, Cyndaquil and Totodile. He is also credited as discovering that Pikachu is an evolved Pokémon. In the Pokémon anime, Jessie, James and Meowth temporarily steal a Totodile from him (in reality he tells them to take it, thinking they are Nurse Joy). His 'absent minded professor' stereotype is even more pronounced in the games as he often forgets to visit his family and his wife worries that he may not remember to eat. He specializes in research regarding Pokémon breeding and is credited with the discovery of Pokémon eggs, even gifting the player a Togepi egg for research via his aide in the games.

Jasmine
Jasmine is the Olivine City Gym Leader and an expert on Steel-type Pokémon. She initially refuses the player's challenge because she is tending to a sick Ampharos named Amphy that provides light for the city lighthouse. Only after giving Amphy proper medicine from Cianwood City can Jasmine be challenged. Jasmine notably appears in Pokémon Diamond and Pearl and Pokémon Platinum in Sunyshore City, where she hands out the Hidden Machine for Waterfall after defeating Volkner in Sunyshore Gym. She also appears as a competitor in Master Rank Pokémon Contests with her Steelix Rusty.

Archer
Archer is the head Neo Team Rocket Executive. He is one of the Team Rocket Admins in FireRed and LeafGreen and the sole Team Rocket Admin in Let's Go, Pikachu! and Let's Go, Eevee!. He also appears as the final Rocket Executive in HeartGold and SoulSilver.

Hoenn
Characters that were introduced in the video games Pokémon Ruby, Sapphire (2002), Emerald (2004), Omega Ruby, or Alpha Sapphire (2014). These video games are all set in the fictional Hoenn region.

Protagonists and rivals
The player can select which character they want to play as, and the other character takes the role of the main rival.

 is an additional rival character in these games. In the beginning, he is a sickly young boy who needs help in catching a Pokémon. Using a borrowed Zigzagoon, Wally is helped by the player character to catch a Ralts. When he later battles the protagonist, he seems healthier and is in tune with his Pokémon. He battles the player for the last official time in Victory Road and waits there, always ready for another battle.

Professor Birch
Professor Birch is a Pokémon researcher, known for his fieldwork and research on Pokémon habitual distribution. In these games, Birch gives the player character and his son Wally each a starter Pokémon: Treecko, Torchic or Mudkip. At the beginning of the game, he is attacked by a dog-like Pokémon and drops his bag, resulting in the player having to use one of his Pokemon to save him from his attacker. In the anime, he gives May her Torchic. In the Pokémon Adventures manga,, he is the father of the character Sapphire.

Norman
Norman is the Petalburg City Gym Leader and an expert on Normal-type Pokémon. In the games, Norman is the protagonist's father. In the anime, he is the father of May and Max. In the Pokémon Adventures manga, he is the father of Ruby and a close friend of Professor Birch.

Wallace
Wallace: Wallace is the Sootopolis City Gym Leader in Pokémon Ruby and Sapphire. He is an expert on Water-type Pokémon and also happens to be a skilled artist and a top Pokemon Contest star. In Pokémon Emerald, Wallace becomes the Pokémon League Champion, leaving the post of Gym Leader to his mentor, Juan. In the anime, he does not make an appearance until the Pokémon: Diamond and Pearl anime series, where he is a Contest Master hailing from the Hoenn region who holds a Contest called the Wallace Cup.

Steven Stone

Steven Stone is the Champion of the Hoenn League in Ruby, Sapphire, Omega Ruby and Alpha Sapphire. He is the son of the president of Devon Corporation and aids the player in their battles against Teams Magma and Aqua. In Emerald, he has retired from competitive battling, but can be challenged at Meteor Falls as the game's ultimate superboss. His signature Pokémon is his Metagross.

Maxie and Archie
Maxie is the leader of Team Magma, which has the goal of waking Groudon to cause a drought to dry out the oceans and expand landmasses, to make the world a better place. In contrast, Archie is the leader of Team Aqua, which has the goal of waking Kyogre to cause a heavy rainfall to flood the landmasses and expand the oceans, also to make the world a better place.

Sinnoh
Characters that were introduced in the video games Pokémon Diamond, Pearl (2006), Platinum (2008), Brilliant Diamond, or Shining Pearl (2021). These video games are all set in the fictional Sinnoh region.

Lucas and Dawn

Barry
 is the rival character in Pokémon Diamond, Pearl and Platinum. He is often impatient and is determined to be the best Trainer of all time. He is best friends with the player and his father, Palmer, owns the Battle Tower in Sinnoh. Sometimes he will aid the player. He tends to accidentally crash into people quite often as he runs about, and often tries to fine people for being too slow. This is due to him apparently wanting to save up for a Battle Tower to compete with his father's.

Professor Rowan
Professor Rowan is the Pokémon Professor in the Pokémon Diamond and Pearl games, having returned to Sinnoh after four years of traveling abroad. A senior researcher to and old friend of Professor Oak, Professor Rowan is known for his research on Pokémon evolution. He is authorized to give trainers one of three Sinnoh starter Pokémon, Turtwig, Chimchar or Piplup. In the anime, he gives Dawn her Piplup. He has an assistant, either Lucas or Dawn, depending on which player character was not chosen by the player.

Cynthia
Cynthia is the Sinnoh League Champion, who uses mostly female Pokémon. She is very interested in mythology and history and spends her time researching and exploring various sites associated with "Legendary" Pokémon of the Sinnoh region. In the game, she helps the protagonist fight against Team Galactic and she assists them once the legendary Giratina appears. In the anime, Ash first meets with Cynthia after she defeats Paul in a battle; she later helps the group fight against Team Galactic. She also appears in Black and White and their sequels, where the player can battle her.

Cyrus
Cyrus is the leader of the villainous Team Galactic. Although it appears he wants to work with his team to create a new dimension, he really wants to create the dimension solely for himself, making it one devoid of emotions that he sees as weak and useless.

Looker
"Looker" is a member of Interpol who appears in Pokémon Platinum investigating Team Galactic. He appears again in Black and White to seek the player's assistance in apprehending the seven sages of Team Plasma. During the events of Black 2 and White 2, he is in another region searching for N with the player character of Black and White. In X and Y, he poses as a detective to investigate a Team Flare scientist. In Sun and Moon, he comes to Alola to assist the player with capturing the Ultra Beasts that were let loose there.

Unova
Characters that were introduced in the video games Pokémon Black and White (2010) or Pokémon Black 2 and White 2 (2012). These video games are all set in the fictional Unova region.

Protagonists

Rivals
 is one of the rival characters in Pokémon Black and White. Cheren is intelligent and trustworthy; he often gives the player character advice and battles the player to test his skills. Like the player, he aims to become the Champion. He is one of the player's childhood friends. Two years later, in Black 2 and White 2, he becomes Aspertia City's Gym Leader. His name is from the Bulgarian word for black:  (cheren).

 is another rival character in Pokémon Black and White. Bianca is spontaneous and sometimes unreliable, but she develops over the course of the journey. She also has a strong side, which she shows when she goes on a Pokémon journey against her father's wishes. Her father wants her to stay back at home, believing it unsafe out in the world, until he is eventually convinced to keep Bianca on her journey by Elesa. She is one of the player's childhood friends. Two years later in the events of Black 2 and White 2, Bianca becomes an assistant to Professor Juniper and gives the player their starter Pokémon. Bianca's name is from the Italian word for white, while her Japanese name "Bel" has the same meaning from Russian:  (bel).

 is the sole rival in Pokémon Black 2 and White 2. He is from Aspertia City and one of the player's childhood friends. Like the player characters, he is also seeking to become a Pokémon Master. Throughout the game, the player helps Hugh retrieve his sister's Purrloin which was stolen by Team Plasma years prior.

Professor Juniper
Professor Aurea Juniper is the Pokémon Professor in the Pokémon Black and White games, the first female professor to appear in the video game series. Professor Juniper specializes in research involving the origins of Pokémon. She gives the player character, Bianca, and Cheren, each one of the game's starter Pokémon: Snivy, Tepig, and Oshawott. In the anime, she gives Trip a Snivy and allows Ash to keep an Oshawott that escapes from her lab. Her father, Cedric Juniper, was also a Pokémon Professor and has since retired.

Fennel
Fennel is a Pokémon professor who studies Pokémon trainers and the dreams of Pokémon. The player encounters her when Team Plasma abducts a Munna from her research facility to use its Dream Mist powers to reach its goals. She gives access to the games' wireless capabilities and online systems.

Alder
Alder: Alder is the former Champion of the Unova League, who helps the player battle Team Plasma throughout Unova. N successfully challenges him to battle and wins, forcing the player to fight N instead. The player can later challenge Alder after finishing the main story of the game. While he does not specialize in a particular Pokémon type, half of his Pokémon are Bug types and his signature Pokémon is Volcarona. He later reveals he had another Volcarona that died before the games begin. He retires from his position by the time Black 2 and White 2 take place (having been succeeded by Iris), but can be battled in his home in Floccesy Town after the player has completed the main story.

N
: N is the leader of Team Plasma. He is a very mysterious trainer who shows up at inconvenient times and believes that all humans and Pokémon should be separated. He was forced to grow up with abused Pokémon, as a plot by his adoptive father Ghetsis, so that he would want to liberate all Pokémon from humans. By following through with the plan, he captures either Zekrom in Black or Reshiram in White in order to show the world his power. N returns in Black 2 and White 2 in a supporting role, enabling the games' mascot Kyurem to transform into its iconic form for the game version. N finally becomes a character the player can challenge on a monthly basis, with the team changing with the games' seasonal cycle.

Colress
Colress: Colress is an independent Pokémon researcher and a proxy leader of Neo Team Plasma, who works to learn about the powers of Pokémon and tries to bring out the true strength within them. He battles the player several times throughout the game to test the player's ability and the power of the player's Pokémon. He eventually aligns with Neo Team Plasma, as they will allow him to study Pokémon the way he wishes. In the main story of Black 2 and White 2, he is the helmsman of the Plasma Frigate, Team Plasma's primary mode of transportation. After Neo Team Plasma is defeated, he helps the group reform their ways. He can then be battled at the P2 Laboratory. He returns in Ultra Sun and Ultra Moon, giving the player the means to fuse Necrozma with Solgaleo/Lunala once they catch the former and helping the player and their allies in defeating Team Rainbow Rocket in the post-game story. He has a larger and more antagonistic role in the anime, as he is building a device that would allow Ghetsis to control Reshiram and he takes control of various Pokémon, including Team Rocket's Meowth, in an effort to fine tune it. It was later destroyed by Ash's Pikachu (having resisted the device's effects) and Reshiram. He specializes in Steel-type Pokémon.

Kalos
Characters that were introduced in the video games Pokémon X and Y (2013). These games are set in the fictional Kalos region.

Calem and Serena

Rivals
 is one of the rivals/friends of the player character in Pokémon X and Y. She is energetic and curious, but still does not know what she wants to gain from her experiences. She gives the player character a nickname at the outset of their journey.

, meanwhile, is more interested in finding new Pokémon to make a perfect Pokémon Dance Team.  is a studious character who wishes to fill up all three parts of the Kalos Region's Pokédex.

Professor Sycamore
Professor Augustine Sycamore is the professor who debuts in the Pokémon games Pokémon X and Y. He battles the player from time to time. Unlike previous professors who gave out the regions' new starter Pokémon, Kalos's starter Pokémon Chespin, Fennekin and Froakie are given to you by one of the player character's friends. Instead, Professor Sycamore gives the player a choice amongst Kanto's starter Pokémon: Bulbasaur, Charmander and Squirtle.

Diantha
Diantha is the Kalos League Champion, but she does not reveal this to the player when they first meet in Lumiose City. She is known in the Kalos Region as a popular celebrity, appearing in films and advertisements, but it is not until the end of the game does the player discover her place in the Pokémon League. She does not specialize in a particular Pokémon type, but her signature Pokémon is her Mega Gardevoir.

Lysandre
Lysandre ( is the leader of the villainous Team Flare, seeking to attain eternal beauty. He follows the player's progress closely, seeking the player character in his plans and revealing the history of Kalos and the king AZ, his ancestor, who nearly wiped out all life. After his identity as Team Flare's leader is revealed, he admits that he wishes to use his ancestor's weapon to enact a mass extinction, believing the Mega Ring to be central to his plans. The player ultimately defeats Lysandre and when Lysandre attempts to activate the weapon, despite the player having captured its power source, the weapon crumbles and destroys the headquarters. In the anime, Lysandre appeared as a recurring antagonist.

Alola
Characters that were introduced in the video games Pokémon Sun and Moon (2016) or Pokémon Ultra Sun and Ultra Moon (2017). These games are all set in the fictional Alola region.

Elio and Selene

Hau and Gladion
  is one of the rivals of Pokémon Sun, Moon, Ultra Sun, and Ultra Moon. Compared to previous rivals, he is more friendly, and loves malasadas. He is Melemele Kahuna Hala's grandson.  is another rival character in these games. This young man lends his strength to Team Skull as an enforcer. He places a high value on being strong in Pokémon battles. His partner Pokémon is the mysterious Type: Null, which later becomes Silvally. He is Lusamine's son and Lillie's brother.

Professor Kukui
 is the Pokémon Professor in Pokémon Sun and Moon. Professor Kukui studies Pokémon moves. He takes Lillie under his wing as his assistant and is married to Professor Burnett. He has a secondary double life as The Masked Royal and is one of the strongest opponents in the Battle Royal Dome. He is good friends with Molayne, who keeps his double life a secret. He takes one of the Alolan starter Pokemon under his wing, whichever was not chosen by Hau or the player, and later uses it in battle in its final form. He acts as the final opponent before becoming Champion in Pokemon Sun and Moon.

Team Skull
 is a gang of street thugs who are the resident villain team of Alola in Pokémon Sun and Moon, secretly working with the Aether Foundation on the promise of money. They were disbanded following the events of the games.
 : Guzma is the boss of Team Skull and battles without mercy. He at one point went through the Island Challenge, but did not meet the criteria to become a captain. He has history with Professor Kukui. He can be teamed up with at the Battle Tree in Double Battles and in the Ultra versions, he helps the player defeat Team Rainbow Rocket out of his loyalty to Lusamine. After that, he appears as a possible Title Defense challenger.
 : Plumeria is Team Skull's admin and helps to keep the team in order. She cares for the grunts beneath her, making her less antagonistic than previous admins. She appears as a possible fighter in Title Defense.

Other characters
: The leader of the Aether Foundation, the mother of Lillie and Gladion and the real villain of the original Sun and Moon games. She is obsessed with the Ultra Beasts, specifically the Nihilego species having fallen under their influence; Gladion speculates her fixation started after her husband vanished while studying them. She unleashed the Nihilego upon Alola before deciding to live a solitary life amongst them in their home realm. She is taken over by a Nihilego at the games' climax in a last-ditch attempt to destroy the heroes. In the Ultra versions, she works with the Ultra Recon Squad and harnessing Nebby's power to fight Necrozma, but is easily defeated by it. She reforms at the end, choosing to no longer interfere in the lives of her children, but is captured by Team Rainbow Rocket and taken hostage in the post-game.

The  is an organization appearing in Pokémon Ultra Sun and Ultra Moon. Their main goal is to investigate Ultra Wormholes, Ultra Beasts and return the light that was stolen from their home by Necrozma.

 is an important character in Sun and Moon and their Ultra versions. She hates Pokémon battles (because she does not like seeing Pokémon getting hurt) and likes reading. She has Nebby the Cosmog in her bag, which she stole from the Aether Foundation because she knew her mother's intentions could end up killing it. She takes refuge with Professor Kukui.

Galar
Characters that were introduced in the video games Pokémon Sword and Shield (2019). These games are set in the fictional Galar region.

Protagonists

Rivals
Sword and Shield features a large number of rival characters. These are:
 : The younger brother of Leon, the Champion of Galar. He idolizes his brother and aspires to become Champion himself. He continues to grow frustrated by constant losses to the player, until he eventually changes paths and sets out on becoming a Pokemon Professor.
 : An arrogant trainer whose Pokémon journey is sponsored by Chairman Rose. After being disqualified from the Gym Challenge, a Gym leader takes him under her wing and strongarms him into becoming her successor. He initially specializes in Psychic-type Pokémon.
 : The younger sister of Piers, who is the Gym leader of Spikemuth. Team Yell, a group of Gym trainers from Spikemuth, are her troublesome fans. After the game's conclusion, she succeeds Piers as the Spikemuth Gym leader. She specializes in Dark-type Pokémon.
 Klara (クララ, Kurara): The rival in the "Isle of Armor" story in Pokémon Sword. She was an underground "idol" and aspires to become a Poison-type Gym leader to acquire fans.
 Avery (セイボリー, Savory): The rival in the "Isle of Armor" story in Pokémon Shield. He came from a family of psychics, but was shunned for not being able to teleport or read minds. He aspires to prove his family wrong and become a Psychic-type Gym leader.

Professors
 is the Pokémon Professor in the Galar region. She studies the Dynamax phenomenon. She is responsible for the player and Hop's "Dynamax Bands". She steps down as Professor near the end of the game.

 is the grand-daughter of Magnolia. She becomes the Galar professor after announcing her discovery of the legend of the Darkest Day. She appears throughout the story prior to this, often assisting the player and Hop. She publishes a book on her Dynamax research, which causes Sordward and Shielbert to start the events of the postgame story. In The Crown Tundra, she is researching the Swords of Justice, Cobalion, Terrakion, and Virizion.

Other characters
Leon is the Champion of the Galar League. He often appears throughout the story, and defeats various out of control Dynamax Pokemon caused by Eternatus. He has a horrible sense of direction and often gets lost. He was childhood rivals with both Sonia and Raihan. After defeating him and becoming the Champion, he will convert the villain's tower base into a Battle Tower. He also sets up the Galarian Star Tournament at the end of The Crown Tundra.

 runs the dojo on the Isle of Armor. He is a former Galar Champion who trained Leon in the past, reigning undefeated for 18 years until he retired due to being asked to participate in a rigged match. He purchased the Isle of Armor and developed an interest in video games.

 is the chairman of the Galar Pokémon League, the president of a large business conglomerate, and the main villain of Sword and Shield. He is obsessed with solving Galar's future energy crisis, and wants to awake Eternatus believing harnessing its power would solve the problem. After the player defeats and catches Eternatus, he voluntarily surrenders to the authorities. He specializes in Steel-type Pokémon.

 &  are the two main antagonists of the post-game story for Pokémon Sword and Shield.

Pokémon Legends: Arceus
Characters that were introduced in Pokémon Legends: Arceus (2022). This game is set in the Hisui region, taking place in the far history of the Sinnoh region of Pokémon Diamond and Pearl.
  and : The male and female protagonists of Pokémon Legends: Arceus.
Professor Laventon: The Pokémon Professor of the Hisui region. He specializes in the ecology of Pokémon.
 Miss Fortune Sisters: A trio of bandits that attack the protagonist in Pokémon Legends: Arceus.
 Volo: The main antagonist of Pokémon Legends: Arceus.
Captain Cyllene: The leader of the Galaxy Team's Survey Corps in Pokémon Legends: Arceus. She is considered by fans as the ancestor of Cyrus, the leader of Team Galactic. She may be strict to others and to herself, but she sees potential in the player and allows him/her to take a trial to join the Galaxy Team.
Commander Kamado: The boss of the Galaxy Team. He may be harsh at times, but the other members of the Galaxy Team look up to him, trust him deeply, and know him as a reliable leader. He is the ancestor of Professor Rowan.
The Hisuiu region features a group of ten Wardens (キャプテン Captain) who are charged with taking care of certain Noble and Ride Pokémon, by making sure their territory is safe and leaving them offerings of water and food to express the clan's gratitude.
Adaman: Adaman is the leader of the Diamond Clan. He believes that Arceus, worshipped by both the Diamond and Pearl Clans, controls time, implying that he represents Dialga, the deity of time. He occasionally engages in conflicts with Irida.
Irida: Irida is the leader of the Pearl Clan. She believes that Arceus, worshipped by both her and Adaman's clans, controls space and dimensions, implying that she represents Palkia, the deity of space and dimensions. She occasionally conflicts with Adaman.
Cogita: Cogita lives in a secret location within the Hisui region known as the Ancient Retreat. She possesses a vast knowledge of the legends of the Hisui region. After the player is banished from Jubilife Village, she instructs the player to collect the items required to forge the Red Chain, an item capable of closing the space-time rift. Once the main story is completed, she gives the player the Pixie Plate, which she had been using as a cutting board, unaware of what it truly was. She also visits the Galaxy HQ, and tells the player of Tornadus, Thundurus, and Landorus, also known as the Forces of Nature. After the player successfully completes their Pokédex entries, she reveals the player that there is one more member of that group: the Fairy and Flying type Enamorus, and tells the player to catch her at the Crimson Mirelands. Once Enamorus is caught, she gives the player the Reveal Glass, capable of transforming the Forces of Nature into their therian forms. She, along with Volo, resemble Cynthia, implying an ancestry.

Paldea
Characters that were introduced in the video games Pokémon Scarlet and Violet (2022). These games are set in the fictional Paldea region. 

  and : The male and female protagonists of Pokémon Scarlet and Violet.
 : The rival in Pokémon Scarlet and Violet. Nemona is the student council president in Naranja/Uva Academy. She is a Champion-rank trainer who is determined to make the player a worthy opponent in battle. Nemona often tests the player's strength by purposefully using weaker teams throughout the game. She is passionate about battling and is often possessive over the player in her hopes to be his/her sole mentor.
  and : The Pokémon Professors in Scarlet and Violet respectively, that are actually robotic duplicates of the originals. They are the first professors not to be named after trees, with Sada's name coming from "pasado", the Spanish word for past, and Turo's name coming from "futuro", the Spanish word for future. They study the possible relationship between ancient/futuristic versions of modern-day Pokémon, known as "Paradox Pokémon". They are indirectly responsible for the appearance of the "Terastal" phenomenon in the games. Their robotic counterpart realised that bringing in Paradox Pokémon from different timelines was wrong, but in the endgame they end up defending the time machine against their will. Afterwards, they decided to travel into to the past and future respectively, knowing it was the only way to stop the time machine from bringing any more Paradox Pokémon to the present.
  is the Gym leader of Medali and specializes in Normal-type Pokémon, and an Elite Four member who specializes in Flying-type Pokémon. He is characterized as a "depressed salaryman" who must work as both a Gym leader and Elite Four member. His blank expression became popular with fans, and was lauded as relatable by critics.
 : (オモダカ Omodaka): Geeta is the Top Champion and administrator of the Paldea League. Nemona refers to her as "La Primera."
 Team Star is an antagonistic team, lead by five separate crew bosses.
 : The founder and "Big Boss" of Team Star. She uses a group of Eevee evolutions as her team and carries a fluffy Eevee bag. It is revealed that the five Crew leaders did not know her identity until the player defeats her.
: Arven is a student of Naranja/Uva Academy, and the son of Professor Sada/Turo. Before the events of Pokémon Scarlet and Violet, Arven was attacked by a Paradox Pokémon, severely injuring his Mabosstiff. He seeks the "Herba Mystica", guarded by the Titan Pokémon, to help heal his Mabosstiff. He accompanies the player into Area Zero to shut off the time machine.

See also

 List of Pokémon
 List of Pokémon video games

References